Raphitoma neerrepenensis is an extinct species of sea snail, a marine gastropod mollusc in the family Raphitomidae.

Description

Distribution
Fossils of this extinct marine species were found in Early Oligocene strata in Belgium

References

 Marquet, R., J. Lenaerts, and J. Laporte. "A systematic study of the Gastropoda (Mollusca) of the Grimmetingen Sand Member (Early Oligocene) in Belgium." Palaeontos (2016).

neerrepenensis
Gastropods described in 2016